is a railway station on the JR Hokkaido Sekihoku Main Line in Yobito, a suburb of Abashiri in Hokkaidō. The station name and suburb name come from the Ainu language.

Station structure
The station has two platforms facing each other, with two railway lines.

Station surroundings
The village of Yobito has a large geographical spread.
National Highway 39
Abashiri-koso
Kanpo Abashiri Inn
Abashiri Grand Hotel
Tokyo University of Agriculture Okhotsk Campus

History
October 5, 1923: Station opened.

Adjacent stations

Railway stations in Hokkaido Prefecture
Railway stations in Japan opened in 1923

Ainu geography